A megamix is a medley remix containing multiple songs in rapid succession. 

Megamix may also refer to:

Music

Albums
Megamix (Big Boy album), 1999
Megamix, by Mate Bulić, 2004
The MegaMix, by Lil Suzy, 1999

Songs
"Megamix" (Boney M. song), 1988
"Mega Mix" (Boney M. song), 1992
"Megamix" (Gloria Estefan song), 1992
"Megamix" (R.I.O. song), 2013
"Mega Mix" (Snap! song), 1991
"Megamix" (Technotronic song), 1990
"Megamix" (Vengaboys song), 2000
"Megamix" (Basshunter song), 2008
"Mega-Mix", by Herbie Hancock
"Megamix '93", a song by Luv', 1993
"Janet Megamix 04", a song by Janet Jackson, 2003
"Chris Cox Megamix", a song by Britney Spears from Greatest Hits: My Prerogative
"Westlife Megamix", a song by Westlife from Coast to Coast

Video games
Dancing Stage MegaMix, a game in the Dance Dance Revolution series
Fighters Megamix, a video game produced by AM2
Rhythm Heaven Megamix, the fourth entry in the Rhythm Heaven series

Other uses
MegaMix, a version of the Vorbis audio encoder

See also
 Megaminx